Dinar may refer to:

 Dinar, currency, name of the following:

 Dinar Líneas Aéreas, Argentinian airlines
 Dinar, Afyonkarahisar, a town in Afyonkarahisar Province, Turkey
 Dinar District, Afyonkarahisar Province, Turkey
 The MIC Dinar is a Sudanese, license-produced variant of the HK G3 rifle.
 Kani Dinar, Iran
 Dinar of Hereti

See also 
 Denar (disambiguation)